Printex Limited is a privately owned textile manufacturing company headquartered in Accra, the capital of Ghana, with over 500 employees. The company was established in 1958 as Millet Textile Corporation (MTC), producing mainly terry towels.

In 1980 the company began operating as Spintex Limited, on a 25+ acre plot on the Spintex Road in a massive expansion program. Spinning, kente clothing weaving, and finishing departments were added to increase production capacity for new textile products including uniforms, shirting materials, dress fabrics, and furnishings.

By 1997 when it assumed its current name, the company had entered into the African textiles market producing woven or printed cotton or polyester viscose blends. Printex ventured into African print market with a trademark Black and White print of intricate designs.

Today the company produces all colors screen prints and African print fabric inspired by a team of textile creatives.

Products
African Print,
African Fashion,
Seer Sucker,
Oheneba,
Piesie,
Diamond (Plain & Colored),
Gold Print,
Opanyin,
Amaamre,
Soso,
Egudie,
Exotic,
Fancy,
Osikani,
Adinkra,
Lace,
Ruby,
Ntamapa-Royale,
Arete,
Xclusive

Fun Facts
Printex is headquartered in Accra the capital of Ghana with an office on Spintex Road.

In 2012, Menaye Donkor, model and wife of International footballer Sulley Muntari was the "Face of Printex"’.

(Ashanti Twi: Maaso Me she bi) is one of the most recognized brand tag lines in Ghana.

External links
 Official website
 Printex on Facebook
 Printex on Pinterest

References

Textile companies of Ghana
Manufacturing companies established in 1982
Manufacturing companies based in Accra
1982 establishments in Ghana
Ghanaian brands